The 2019 Harborough District Council election took place on 2 May 2019 to elect members of the Harborough District Council in England. It was held on the same day as other local elections.

Summary

Election result

|-

Ward results

Billesdon & Tilton

Bosworth

Broughton Astley - Primethorpe & Sutton

Broughton Astley South & Leire

Dunton

Fleckney

Glen

Kibworths

Lubenham

Lutterworth East

Lutterworth West

Market Harborough - Great Bowden & Arden

Market Harborough - Little Bowden

Market Harborough - Logan

Market Harborough - Welland

Misterton

Nevill

Thurnby & Houghton

Ullesthorpe

By-elections

Market Harborough - Little Bowden

Market Harborough - Logan

References

2019 English local elections
May 2019 events in the United Kingdom
2019
2010s in Leicestershire